Long Bredy is a village and civil parish in the county of Dorset in south-west England, situated approximately  west of the county town Dorchester. It is sited in the valley of the small River Bride, beneath chalk hills of the Dorset Downs. In the 2011 census the parish had a population of 208.

The environs of Long Bredy have some prehistoric history, including a burial chamber known as The Grey Mare and her Colts.  The village itself is thought to have been established around the 9th century, and in 1086 was recorded in the Domesday Book as 'Langebride', which would have been pronounced 'Langabridda'.  To the east of the village is Kingston Russell house, a 17th-century mansion.

Bottle Knap Cottage, owned by the National Trust, is a Grade II listed building. In May 2013 human skeletal remains were discovered near the cottage which dated back to approximately 800 to 600 BC, according to radiocarbon dating. Martin Papworth, an archaeologist with the National Trust, said, "The remains are of three teenage or young adults, probably crouched, are all from around the period when the first iron was being used in this country. No other burials in Dorset have been identified from this time."

Notes

External links

Villages in Dorset